Alfred Bennett (born 13 November 1898; date of death unknown) was an English footballer who played as a goalkeeper for Nottingham Forest and Port Vale.

Career
Bennett played for Clowne Rising Star and Nottingham Forest, before joining Port Vale in May 1927. Preferred to George Holdcroft and Howard Matthews, he played 24 Second Division appearances and played one FA Cup game in the 1927–28 season. However, he was replaced by new signing Jack Prince, and after playing just 11 times in the 1928–29 season, he left The Old Recreation Ground on a free transfer in May 1929.

Career statistics
Source:

References

1898 births
Year of death missing
People from Clowne
Footballers from Derbyshire
English footballers
Association football goalkeepers
Nottingham Forest F.C. players
Port Vale F.C. players
English Football League players